The Expert Field Medical Badge (EFMB) is a United States Army special skills badge first created on June 18, 1965. This badge is the non-combat equivalent of the Combat Medical Badge (CMB) and is awarded to U.S. military personnel and North Atlantic Treaty Organization (NATO) military personnel who successfully complete a set of qualification tests, including both written and performance portions. The EFMB is known for its adherence to its testing standards and, as such, requires strict attention to detail from candidates in order to receive a "GO" on its combat testing lanes. The pass rate for FY 2017 was 7%, making the EFMB one of the most difficult and prestigious Army special skill badges to earn. 

Any Military Occupational Specialty (MOS) may attempt to earn the badge. However, the wear of the badge is only authorized when a service member is currently serving or has served in a medical-series MOS during the time that the service member earned it. The infantry equivalent of the Expert Field Medical Badge is the Expert Infantryman Badge (EIB). The MOS 18D Special Forces Medical Sergeant, are only authorized to earn the EFMB as an expert skill badge, and they are not authorized to earn the EIB, but are authorized to wear the CIB if awarded.

Current badge requirements (as of 2019) 
Army Physical Fitness Test Score at least 80 points in each event at the test.
M4 Basic Marksmanship Qualification Qualify "Expert" within the last 12 months.
Current CPR certification
Comprehensive Written Test 80 multiple choice questions; 75% to pass. There are four references for the written test: Unit Field Sanitation Team (ATP 4-25.12), Medical Support to Detainee Operations (ATP 4-02.46), Soldier's Manual of Common Tasks (STP 21-1-SMCT), and Soldier's Manual and Trainer's Guide, MOS 68W Health Care Specialist (STP 8-68W13-SM-TG).
Land Navigation Day and night land navigation courses. The candidate must be able to locate three out of four assigned points. The candidate is given three hours each during the day and night to complete the task.
Combat Testing Lane 1
 Disassemble, assemble, and perform a functions check on an M4 or M4A1 Carbine (or M16 Rifle)
 Move under direct fire
 Correct malfunction of an M4 Carbine or M16-series Rifle
 Perform a Tactical Combat Casualty Care patient assessment
 Evacuate casualties using one-person carries or drags
 Control bleeding using a tourniquet
 Control bleeding using a hemostatic device
 Control bleeding using dressings
 Initiate a saline lock and intravenous infusion
 Initiate treatment for hypovolemic shock and prevent hypothermia
 React to indirect fire
 Triage casualties
 Insert nasopharyngeal airway
 Treat a penetrating chest wound
 Perform needle chest decompression
 Treat an open head injury
 Treat an open abdominal wound
 Immobilize a suspected fracture of the arm
 Treat lacerations, contusions, and extrusions of the eye
 Prepare a Tactical Combat Casualty Care (TCCC) Card
 Evacuate casualties using two-person carries or drags
 Load casualties onto ground evacuation platform (M996, M997, or M113)
Combat Testing Lane 2
 Disassemble, assemble, and perform a functions check on an M9 Pistol
 React to an UXO or possible IED
 Submit Explosive Hazard Spot Report
 Protect yourself from chemical/biological contamination using your assigned protective mask
 Decontaminate yourself using chemical decontamination kits
 Protect yourself from CBRN injury/contamination with Joint Services Lightweight Integrated Suit Technology (JSLIST) chemical protective ensemble
 Perform self-aid for mild nerve agent poisoning
 Submit NBC 1 Report
 Protect yourself from chemical or biological injury/contamination when removing Mission Oriented Protective Posture using JSLIST
 Store the M40-series protective mask with/without hood
 Load casualties onto nonstandard vehicle (5-ton M-1085, M-1093, or 2 ½-ton M-1081)
 Load casualties onto nonstandard vehicle (2 ½-ton, 6x6 or 5-ton, 6x6, Cargo Truck)
 Load casualties onto nonstandard vehicle (1 ¼-ton, 4x4, M998)
Combat Testing Lane 3
 Move over, through, or around obstacles
 Evacuate casualties using litter carries
 Extricate casualties from a vehicle
 Evacuate a casualty using a SKED litter
 Load casualties onto ground evacuation platform (Stryker Medical Evacuation Vehicle [MEV] M1113) 
 Load casualties onto a UH-60 helicopter
 Load casualties onto a HH-60L helicopter
 Establish a helicopter landing point
 Assemble and operate SINCGARS or SINCGARS (ASIP)
 Load FH/COMSEC data and conduct radio check using SINCGARS or SINGCARS (ASIP)
 Prepare and transmit a MEDEVAC request (using Secure Mode radio)
Forced Road March 12-mile road march with a standard fighting load to be completed in under three hours. The candidate may not sling his/her assigned weapon or take off any of his/her worn equipment at any time during the road march. The candidate must complete the road march with the assigned gear and equipment from start to finish. An inspection of the candidate's equipment is conducted at the end of the road march. This is the final task that the candidate must complete; successful completion is followed by the graduation ceremony and badge presentation.

Previous test requirements (before 2008) 

Comprehensive Written Test 100 multiple choice questions; 75% to pass.
Army Physical Fitness Test Pass to standard.
M16 Weapons Qualification Pass to standard within last 12 months.
Land Navigation Day and night land navigation courses.
Forced Road March 12-mile road march with a standard fighting load to be completed in three hours.
Litter Obstacle Course Done as a 4-man team with candidates graded individually.
Lane testing Tasks graded individually but lanes are pass/fail.
 Communications: Competency with field radios and radio techniques. "Prepare and transmit a MEDEVAC request" must be one of the three of four tasks passed in order to receive an overall "GO" for the lane.
 Survival:  Demonstrate knowledge of survival skills in an NBC environment and combat situations including use of the M16 series rifle.
 Emergency Medical Treatment: Demonstrate treatment of various wounds similar to those in a combat situation.
 Evacuation of Sick and Wounded: Demonstrate evacuation techniques utilizing vehicles and manual carries.
 Cardiopulmonary Resuscitation (CPR): Demonstrate proficiency in CPR using the one-person method.

In summary, current requirements differ from previous requirements with the addition of the M9 Pistol for survival tasks, CPR card certification in lieu of demonstrating CPR proficiency, and the reorganization of the lanes into a combat scenario.

EFMB Pass / Fail Rates for FY98 to FY01 

FY 01 EFMB Test Pass Rates (Overall EFMB Test Pass Rate- 16%)

Written Test -55%
Day Land Navigation – 80%
Night Land Navigation – 72%
Communications – 82%
Survival – 95%
Emergency Medical Treatment -73 %
Evacuation – 90%
Litter Obstacle Course -96 %
CPR -85%
12 Mile Road March – 86%

FY 00 EFMB Test Pass Rates (Overall EFMB Test Pass Rate- 18%)

Written Test -66%
Day Land Navigation – 83%
Night Land Navigation – 63%
Communications – 78%
Survival – 94%
Emergency Medical Treatment -81 %
Evacuation – 89%
Litter Obstacle Course -97 %
CPR -85%
12 Mile Road March – 91%

FY 99 EFMB Test Pass Rates (Overall EFMB Test Pass Rate – 21%)

Written Test – 51%
Day Land Navigation – 82%
Night Land Navigation – 80%
Communications – 86%
Survival – 92%
Emergency Medical Treatment – 81%
Evacuation – 90%
Litter Obstacle Course – 89%
CPR – 87%
12 Mile Road March – 90%

FY 98 EFMB Test Pass Rates (Overall EFMB Test Pass Rate – 21%)

Written Test – 63%
Day Land Navigation – 81%
Night Land Navigation – 76%
Communications – 86%
Survival – 91%
Emergency Medical Treatment – 74%
Evacuation – 87%
Litter Obstacle Course – 91%
CPR – 84%
12 Mile Road March – 91%

References

External links
 Information Paper on EFMB testing changes (May 2005)
 Expert Field Medical Badge Branch Website
 AR 672-10 Expert Field Medical Badge (June 1984)
 EXPERT FIELD MEDICAL BADGE (EFMB) TEST 2 January 2004 Pam 350-10

United States military badges
Military medicine in the United States